, also known as Hirakiki-jinja, is a Japanese Shinto shrine in Ibusuki, Kagoshima on the island of Kyushu.

History
Hirasaki was the chief Shinto shrine (ichinomiya) of the old Satsuma Province.  It serves today as one of the ichinomiya of Kagoshima Prefecture.  

See also
 List of Shinto shrines in Japan
 Modern system of ranked Shinto Shrines

References

External links

Official Website 

Shinto shrines in Kagoshima Prefecture
Ibusuki, Kagoshima

Beppyo shrines